Hopewell is an unincorporated community in Westmoreland County, Pennsylvania, United States. It lies at an elevation of 1572 feet (479 m).

References

Unincorporated communities in Westmoreland County, Pennsylvania
Unincorporated communities in Pennsylvania